The Interloper is a lost 1918 silent feature film directed by Oscar Apfel and starring Kitty Gordon.

Cast
Kitty Gordon - Jane Cameron
Irving Cummings - Paul Whitney
Warren Cook - Whitney Pere
Isabel Berwin - Mrs. Whitney
June Blackman - Aunt Patricia
Frank Mayo - Edmond Knapp
George MacQuarrie - Courtney Carvel
Anthony Byrd - Eph
I. Quong - Kamoto
Tom Cameron - the Whitney's Butler

References

External links
The Interloper at IMDb.com

1918 films
American silent feature films
Lost American films
American black-and-white films
Films directed by Oscar Apfel
World Film Company films
1913 drama films
1913 films
Silent American drama films
1918 lost films
Lost drama films
1918 drama films
1910s American films